Alberto Héber Usher (May 1, 1918 – January 19, 1981) was a Uruguayan politician, who served as President of Uruguay from March 1, 1966, to March 1, 1967.

Background
Héber was born in Montevideo. His parents were Blanca Usher Conde and Alberto Héber Uriarte (grand-nephew of Juan D. Jackson). He was a member of the National Party, and was elected to the Chamber of Deputies in 1958.

His brother, Mario Héber (d.1980), was a prominent public representative and opposition leader during the civilian-military administration of 1973–1985. His nephew Luis Alberto Héber has been a prominent National Party Deputy and Senator.

President of the National Council of Government
In 1958 Héber was elected a member of the National Council of Government, which he presided from 1966 to 1967. His period of office coincided with constitutional changes which envisaged lengthening the President's term of office to 5 years. In the event, however, his successor Óscar Diego Gestido served for only a few months.

Death
He died in Montevideo in 1981.

See also
 Politics of Uruguay
 List of political families#Uruguay

References

 :es:Alberto Héber Usher

Presidents of the National Council of Government (Uruguay)
1918 births
1981 deaths
Politicians from Montevideo
Uruguayan people of German descent
Uruguayan people of British descent
National Party (Uruguay) politicians
Uruguayan vice-presidential candidates
Candidates for President of Uruguay